Andrena suerinensis is a species of insect belonging to the family Andrenidae.

It is native to Central Europe.

References

suerinensis